Longcun is a town under the jurisdiction of Wuhua County, Meizhou City, Guangdong Province, southern China.

See also 
 List of township-level divisions of Guangdong

References 

Towns in Guangdong
Wuhua County